The 2017–18 William & Mary Tribe women's basketball team represents The College of William & Mary during the 2017–18 NCAA Division I women's basketball season. The Tribe, led by fifth year head coach Ed Swanson, play their home games at Kaplan Arena and were members of the Colonial Athletic Association (CAA). They finished the season 16–14, 7–11 in CAA play to finish in sixth place. They lost in the quarterfinals of the CAA women's tournament to Elon.

Roster

Schedule

|-
!colspan=9 style=| Non-conference regular season

|-
!colspan=9 style=| CAA regular season

|-
!colspan=9 style=|

See also
2017–18 William & Mary Tribe men's basketball team

Footnotes

References

William & Mary Tribe women's basketball seasons
William And Mary
William
William